The International Association of Public Transport (UITP, from the ) is a non-profit advocacy organization for public transport authorities and operators, policy decision-makers, scientific institutes and the public transport supply and service industry. The association was founded on 17 August 1885 by King Leopold II in Brussels, Belgium, to support the Belgian tram and steel industries. UITP supports a holistic approach to urban mobility and advocates for public transport development and sustainable mobility.

Organization

UITP represents an international network of more than 1,900 member companies located in more than 100 countries and covers all modes of public transport – metro, light rail, regional and suburban railways, bus, and waterborne transport. It also represents collective transport in a broader sense.

UITP's network counts one main and EU office in Brussels and fifteen regional and liaison offices worldwide (Abidjan, Bangalore, Casablanca, Dubai, Hong Kong, Istanbul, Johannesburg, Moscow, New York, São Paulo, Singapore, Tehran, Mexico & Central America, New Delhi, and Melbourne).

Khalid Alhogail, the Chief Executive Officer and Managing Director of the Saudi Public Transport Company (SAPTCO), has been voted in as UITP’s new President at the most recent General Assembly for the 2021-2023 term.

As CEO and MD of SAPTCO for the past 15 years, Khalid Alhogail is a well-known industry figure, overseeing one of the largest public transport companies in the Middle East and North Africa (MENA) region.

The General Secretariat in Brussels is managed by Mohamed Mezghani, who has been working for more than 25 years in public transport and urban mobility related fields. He has been the Deputy Secretary General of the Association since January 2014 until his election in 2017.

Activities

 UITP gathers and analyses facts and figures to provide quantitative and qualitative information on key aspects of public transport and urban mobility.
 UITP manages an on-line information centre MyLibrary, which gives access to the full texts of UITP’s studies and conference papers, as well as references to books, articles and websites. A picture library and statistics on public transport operators are also available.
 UITP carries out studies, projects and surveys; the results are made available in brochures and reports.
 UITP works on projects for international institutions, such as the European Commission. Under the framework of these projects UITP launches and participates in thematic networks of mobility experts on public transport policy and organisation.
 UITP issues official positions on global mobility issues, representing the views of the sector.
 UITP tries to engages a number of international bodies - such as the United Nations (UNEP, UNDESA, UNFCCC, UNHABITAT), the World Bank and European institutions.
 UITP organises raining courses, workshops and seminars for public transport experts
 UITP collaborates in the Transports Public show, in Paris.
 UITP organises a biennial event, the UITP Global Public Transport Summit.
 UITP is a member of the Group of Representative Bodies.

See also
 List of metro systems
 Sustainable transport

References

External links 
 UITP – official homepage
 UITP Global Public Transport Summit - uitpsummit.org
UITP's Activity Highlights 2020 Report
Y4PT – official homepage
 A virtual exhibition about urban transportation in the world.

Sustainable transport
Sustainable urban planning
Transportation planning
Public transport advocacy organizations
Environmental organisations based in Belgium
International environmental organizations
International transport organizations
Trade associations based in Belgium
Organizations established in 1885